Thalassomya is a genus of midges in the non-biting midge family (Chironomidae).

Species
T. africana Edwards, 1926
T. bureni Wirth, 1949
T. frauenfeldi Schiner, 1856
T. gutae De Oliveira, Da Silva, & Trivinho-Strixino, 2013
T. japonica Tokunaga & Komyo, 1996
T. longipes Johnson, 1924
T. maritima Wirth, 1947
T. pilipes Edwards, 1928
T. sabroskyi Tokunaga, 1964
T. setosipennis Wirth, 1947

References

Chironomoidea genera